This is a list of extinct languages of Europe, languages which have undergone language death, have no native speakers and no spoken descendant. As the vast majority of Europeans speak Indo-European languages, a result of the westward portion of the prehistoric Indo-European migrations, the bulk of the indigenous languages of Europe became extinct thousands of years ago without leaving any record of their existence as they were superseded by Celtic, Italic, Germanic, Balto-Slavic, Hellenic, and Iranian Indo-European languages. A small minority of these extinct languages, however, survived long enough to be attested.

On the other hand, many European Indo-European languages themselves, such as Gothic, have also become extinct. In some cases however, it is not known whether a language has a spoken descendant or not. For example, because of the uncertain origin of the Albanian language—aside from its being an Indo-European language—and because little remains of the ancient languages in question, it is disputed whether Dacian, Thracian or Illyrian have a spoken descendant, Albanian.

136 languages are listed.

Abroad
Germanic
Gothic (France, Iberian Peninsula, Italy, Northern & Central Europe)

Eastern Europe

Caucasus
Alarodian
Èrsh
Hurrian
Urartian
Semitic
Shirvani Arabic
Iranian
Kilit
Old Azeri
Cimmerian
Indo-Aryan
Garachi
Northwest Caucasian
Ubykh

Russia and Ukraine

Northern Europe

Greenland (Denmark)
Germanic
Greenlandic Norse

Northern and Central Europe

Southeast Europe

Balkans
Hellenic
Yevanic
Aeolic Greek
Ancient Macedonian 
Arcadocypriot Greek
Pamphylian Greek
Locrian Greek
Italic
Dalmatian
Pannonian Romance
Turkic
Bulgar
Pecheneg
Indo-European
Dacian
Thracian
Illyrian
Liburnian
Paeonian
Brygian
Dardani
Unclassified
Minoan
Eteocretan
Eteocypriot
Pelasgian

Southern Europe

Anatolia

Graeco-Phrygian
Phrygian
Unclassified
Isaurian
Ancient Cappadocian
Mysian
Celtic
Galatian
Anatolian
Luwian
Lycian
Lydian
Carian
Hittite
Palaic
Pisidian
Sidetic
Milyan
Hattic
Kaskian

Canary Islands (Spain) 
Afroasiatic
Berber
Guanche

Iberian Peninsula

Italy

Western Europe

British Isles
Celtic languages
Cumbric
Pictish
Galwegian Gaelic
Germanic languages
Fingallian
Norn
Yola
Romance languages
Auregnais
Anglo-Norman
British Vulgar Latin
Old Kentish Sign Language

France
Celtic
Gaulish
Italic
Shuadit
Zarphatic
Old French Sign Language
Unclassified
Paleo-Corsican

See also

List of European languages
List of endangered languages in Europe

Lists of extinct languages
Languages of Europe
Europe-related lists